The Athol Murray Trophy is a Canadian ice hockey series to determine the Saskatchewan Junior B championship and seed of the Keystone Cup - the Western Canada Junior "B" Hockey Crown.

History
Since the 1960s the tournament has been an important determining factor in the crowning of the Western Canadian champion.  Since the Keystone Cup's inception in 1983, Saskatchewan teams have been the champion a leading 9 times.  In some ways, the winning of the Saskatchewan Provincials may directly or indirectly determine the outcome of the Keystone Cup.  The Championship has run every year since 1965, but the first ever Saskatchewan Junior "B" Champion seems to have been the Saskatoon Wesleys in 1951.

Throughout the 1990s and early 2000s, the North Saskatchewan Junior B Hockey League and South Saskatchewan Junior B Hockey League played off for the Murray Trophy.  Since 2007 the two leagues have been merged as the Prairie Junior Hockey League.

Champions
1950 Regina Maroons
1951 Saskatoon Wesleys
1952 Regina Maroons
1953 Yorkton
1954 Yorkton
1955 Lebret Indians
1956 Lebret Indians
1957 Lebret Indians
1958 Lebret Indians
1959 Lebret Indians
1962 Melville
1963 Weyburn Elks
1964 Regina Pats
1965 	Saskatoon Blades 
1966 	North Battleford	 
1967 	Shellbrook Knights
1968 Weyburn Red Wings
1969 Moose Jaw Canuck Bees
1970 	St. Peters College Muenster (NSJHL)	 
1971 	Saskatoon Macs 	(NSJHL)
1972 	St. Thomas College Imperials (NSJHL)
1973 	St. Thomas College Imperials (NSJHL) 
1974 	Saskatoon Quakers (NSJHL)	 
1975 	Saskatoon Quakers (NSJHL)
1976 	Melfort TM's (NSJHL) 
1977 	Melfort TM's (NSJHL)
1978 	Saskatoon Quakers  (NSJHL) 
1979 	Melfort TM's (NSJHL)
1980 Notre Dame Hounds
1981 	Hudson Bay Saints (NSJHL)	 
1982 	Saskatoon Quakers (NSJHL)	 
1983 	Saskatoon Wesleys (NSJHL)	 
1984 	Saskatoon Wesleys (NSJHL)	 
1985 	Prince Albert North Stars (NSJHL)	 
1986 	Prince Albert North Stars (NSJHL)	 
1987 	Hudson Bay Saints (NSJHL) 
1988 	Warman Valley Crusaders (NSJHL) 
1989 	Kinistino Tigers (NSJHL)
1990 	Kinistino Tigers (NSJHL)
1991 	Kinistino Tigers (NSJHL) 
1992 	Kinistino Tigers (NSJHL) 
1993 	Kinistino Tigers (NSJHL)
1994 	Kinistino Tigers (NSJHL)
1995 	Regina Capitals (SSJHL)
1996 	Assiniboia Southern Rebels (SSJHL)
1997 	Grenfell Storm (SSJHL)
1998 	Saskatoon Royals (NSJHL)
1999 	Assiniboia Southern Rebels (SSJHL)
2000 	Saskatoon Royals (SSJHL)
2001 	Assiniboia Southern Rebels (SSJHL)
2002 	Assiniboia Southern Rebels (SSJHL)
2003 	Assiniboia Southern Rebels (SSJHL)
2004 	Regina Capitals (SSJHL)
2005 	Saskatoon Royals (NSJHL)
2006   Saskatoon Royals (NSJHL)
2007   Saskatoon Royals (NSJHL)
2008   Pilot Butte Storm (PJHL)
2009   Saskatoon Royals (PJHL)
2010   Tri-Town Thunder (PJHL)
2011   Pilot Butte Storm (PJHL)
2012   Pilot Butte Storm (PJHL)
2013   Saskatoon Royals (PJHL)
2014   Saskatoon Quakers (PJHL)

See also
Athol Murray

External links
Saskatchewan Provincial History
North Saskatchewan Junior "B"
Prairie Junior "B"
Saskatchewan Hockey Association

Ice hockey in Saskatchewan
Ice hockey tournaments in Canada